Schiffsverkehr is the 13th full-length album by German singer Herbert Grönemeyer, released in March 2011. It was recorded in Berlin, Stockholm, London and New York City and was produced by Alex Silva and Herbert Grönemeyer, like the previous album 12. and every album since Bleibt alles anders in 1998.

The album reached the top spot in the German, Austrian, and Swiss charts, as well as #34 in the Netherlands. The title track also became the lead single; it peaked at #10 in Germany, #33 in Austria and #45 in Switzerland.

Track listing

Charts

Weekly charts

Year-end charts

References

2011 albums
German-language albums
EMI Records albums
Herbert Grönemeyer albums
Albums produced by Alex Silva